Horst Piepenburg (born 9 March 1954) is a German jurist specialising in bankruptcy law. He is the co-founder of Piepenburg & Gerling, one of the leading bankruptcy law firms in Germany, and has worked more than 1,000 insolvency cases, including Babcock Borsig and PIN Group.

In June 2009, Piepenburg was appointed bankruptcy manager of Arcandor, the "biggest insolvency currently underway in Germany." He resigned from this post in July, citing the "lack of support by Arcandor's large shareholder," private bank Sal. Oppenheim, as the reason for his decision.

References

External links
Profile on Piepenburg-Gerling.de

1954 births
Living people
Jurists from North Rhine-Westphalia
University of Münster alumni
People from Rees, Germany